, also known by his Chinese style name , was a bureaucrat, politician and scholar of Japanese literature of the Ryukyu Kingdom.

Shikina was born to an aristocrat family called Mō-uji Inoha Dunchi. He was the third son of Inoha Seiki, and also a younger brother of Inoha Seihei (also known as Mōi Ueekata). Both Seiki and Seihei had been served as Sanshikan, and Shikina Seimei himself served as a member of Sanshikan from 1702 to 1712. In his term, he was assigned to take charge of collecting Omoro Sōshi (1710), and compiling  (1711), the first dictionary of the Okinawan language in history.

References

Ueekata
Sanshikan
People of the Ryukyu Kingdom
Ryukyuan people
17th-century Ryukyuan people
18th-century Ryukyuan people
1652 births
1715 deaths